Senator Bryson may refer to:

Dean F. Bryson (1910–1995), Oregon State Senate
Jim Bryson (politician) (born 1961), Tennessee State Senate